Solenne Mary (born 2 March 1981  Saint-Martin-d'Hères) is a French fencer (sabre) .

She competed at the 2008 Summer Youth Olympics. 2006 World Fencing Championship team saber in Turin, winning a gold medal, and 2009 World Fencing Championship team saber,  in Antalya, winning a silver medal.

She competes for  University of Strasbourg  club.

References 

French female sabre fencers
1981 births
Living people
People from Saint-Martin-d'Hères
Sportspeople from Isère